Book of Velocities is a solo album by pianist Jon Balke recorded in 2006 and released on the ECM label in 2007.

Reception
The Allmusic review by Thom Jurek awarded the album 3½ stars stating "nothing could have prepared the listener for this gorgeous set of unedited, unprocessed, and undubbed piano pieces... It is very minimal, but also very malleable; change is the order of the proceeding, so a quiet form of delight is given to the listener as the process of discovery unfolds over and over again. Highly recommended".

Track listing
All compositions by Jon Balke
 "Chapter 1: Giada" - 3:34 
 "Chapter 1: Scintilla" - 0:56 
 "Chapter 1: Spread" - 4:26 
 "Chapter 1: Castello" - 3:48 
 "Chapter 1: Resilience" - 3:34 
 "Chapter 2: Single Line" - 2:34 
 "Chapter 2: Nyl" - 3:35 
 "Chapter 2: Double Line" - 3:09 
 "Chapter 3: Obsidian" - 3:26 
 "Chapter 3: Sunday Shapes" - 3:19 
 "Chapter 3: Gum Bounce" - 2:00 
 "Chapter 3: Finger Bass" - 3:23 
 "Chapter 3: Contrivance" - 2:45 
 "Chapter 4: Drape Hanger" - 3:15 
 "Chapter 4: Septima Llegada" - 2:03 
 "Chapter 4: Reel Set" - 1:25 
 "Chapter 4: Scrim Stand" - 3:17 
 "Epilogue: Sonance" - 4:46 
 "Epilogue: Nefriit" - 2:58 
Recorded at Radio Studio DRZ in Zürich, Switzerland in September 2006.

Personnel
 Jon Balke – piano

References

ECM Records albums
2007 albums
Albums produced by Manfred Eicher
Solo piano jazz albums